Laurent Huard (born 26 August 1973 in Fougères, Ille-et-Vilaine) is a French football coach who had a playing career. He is currently the assistant manager of AS Saint-Étienne.

Huard played for nine years at Stade Rennais, before stints at Sedan and Saint-Étienne. In 2002, he had to shorten his career due to heart problems.

External links
 
 Profile
 Laurent Huard at Footballdatabase

1973 births
Living people
People from Fougères
French footballers
Stade Rennais F.C. players
CS Sedan Ardennes players
AS Saint-Étienne players
Association football midfielders
Sportspeople from Ille-et-Vilaine
Footballers from Brittany
Brittany international footballers